The 2023 Superliga Colombiana (officially known as the Superliga BetPlay Dimayor 2023 for sponsorship purposes) was the twelfth edition of the Superliga Colombiana, Colombia's football super cup tournament organized by DIMAYOR. It was contested by Atlético Nacional and Deportivo Pereira, champions of the 2022 Categoría Primera A season tournaments, from 8 to 16 February 2023.

Atlético Nacional defeated Deportivo Pereira 5–3 on aggregate to win their third Superliga Colombiana title.

Teams

Matches

First leg

Second leg

''Atlético Nacional won 5–3 on aggregate.

References

External links
Superliga on Dimayor's website

Superliga Colombiana
Superliga
Superliga